Arta is a female name derived from the Albanian word artë, which means golden. Notable people with the name include:

Arta (Kamuia), elder brother of the 1st century BCE Indo-Scythian ruler Maues
Arta Bajrami (born 1980), Kosovar Albanian singer
Arta Dobroshi (born 1980), Kosovar Albanian actress
Arta Muçaj (born 1974), Kosovar Albanian actress

References

Given names
Albanian feminine given names
Feminine given names